Mukhra is a super-hit 1958 Pakistani Punjabi film. Many of its film songs became very popular due to its superb music by music director Rasheed Attre.

Cast
 Mohammad Afzal- Himalaywala
 Allauddin
 Anjum
 Darpan
 Ilyas Kashmiri
 Sabiha Khanum - Sabiha
 Santosh Kumar - Santosh
 Diljeet Mirza (comedian)
 Ghulam Mohammed 		
 Nazar (comedian) 	
 Asha Posley		
 Bibbo
 Nayyar Sultana		
 Yasmin

Reception
This film was rated as a "hit" Punjabi film of 1958 in Pakistan.

Soundtrack
The music of the film was composed by Rasheed Attre with famous singers of the time including Zubaida Khanum, Naseem Begum, Munir Hussain and Sain Akhtar. The popular film songs were written by Waris Ludhianvi.

 "Doray khich ke na kajra paayye maapiyan de pind kurriay", Sung by Zubaida Khanum
 "Dilla, thehr ja yaar da nazara lain de", Sung by Munir Hussain  
 "Main dardi Surma na pawan, Akhaan wich mahi wasda..." Zubaida Khanum
 (Bhairvi raag on violin)	                 
 "Mera dil channa, kachh da khadona...", Sung by Zubaida Khanum
 "Naley nach naley Gon, te pambeeri wangu ponh...", Sung by Naseem Begum, Munir Hussain
 "Mahi sahnu takna te assan sharmana...", Sung by Zubaida Khanum 
 "Dilla, thehr ja yaar da nazara lain de", Sung by Zubaida Khanum 
 "Meri Akh tera Dil na chura le...", Sung by Zubaida Khanum 
 "Meinu dasdi chanani teri, we chhup ja chann...", Sung by  Zubaida Khanum
 "Mere do mastaney nain, raat din rehnde...", Sung by Zubaida Khanum

Special screening at Lok Virsa Museum
On 11 August 2018, this old classic Pakistani Punjabi film was selected to be screened by the Lok Virsa Museum management (Lok Virsa Film Club Mandwa).

References

External links
Mukhra (1958) Punjabi film and its soundtracks on IMDb website 

1958 films
Punjabi-language Pakistani films
Pakistani black-and-white films
1950s Punjabi-language films
Films scored by Rashid Attre